Live in Branson, MO, USA is a live album by American country music artist, Connie Smith. The album was released in 1993 on Laserlight Records and was produced by Ralph Jungheim. It was Smith's first official album (other than compilations) since 1978's New Horizons.

Background 
Live in Branson, MO, USA was Connie Smith's first live album. The album was recorded at a theater in Branson, Missouri October 13, 1992. The album consisted of nine tracks, which also included a ten-minute medley of her hits. Seven of the album's tracks were Smith's hits, including her #1 single, "Once a Day," and four other recordings from Smith's years at RCA Victor Records. The album also includes two singles from her years at Columbia Records: "You've Got Me (Right Where You Want Me)" and "I've Got My Baby on My Mind." In addition, the album featured two Gospel songs, "How Great Thou Art" and a cover of Martha Carson's "Satisfied."

The album was reviewed by Allmusic critic, Dan Cooper, who gave the release three out of five stars. A full description of the release was not included.

Track listing

Personnel 
 Jimmy Capps – guitar
 Rod Ham – bass
 Mark Pearman – fiddle
 Connie Smith – lead vocals
 Gary Smith – piano
 Jack Smith – steel guitar, leader
 Steve Turner – drums

References 

1993 live albums
Connie Smith live albums